Pêcheresse is a lambic fruit Belgian beer produced by the Lindemans Brewery since 1987.

The name is the combination of the French for peach and the feminine French word for sinner. On the label of the bottle is a drawing of a young woman, drawn in Art nouveau style, lying seductively on the sand, representing the sinner mentioned in the name of the beer.

As the name indicates, the beer is flavored with peach juice and the label says that each bottle contains 20% of peach concentrate.

References

External links 
 Lindemans' Website
 Japanese-bier's Website

Belgian beer brands